Kjeldahl nitrogen may refer to:

 Kjeldahl method
 Total Kjeldahl Nitrogen